Clement Paul Valandra (born June 6, 1953) is an American former politician. He served in the South Dakota House of Representatives from 2001 to 2006 and in the Senate from 1991 to 2000.

References

1953 births
Living people
People from Mission, South Dakota
People from Cumberland County, North Carolina
Democratic Party members of the South Dakota House of Representatives
Democratic Party South Dakota state senators